Louisville Fall City were a professional baseball team based in Louisville, Kentucky which played in the Negro leagues.  The Fall City team played in the National Colored Base Ball League, also known as the League of Colored Baseball Clubs, throughout that league's brief existence in 1887.

References

1887 in baseball
Defunct baseball teams in Kentucky
Defunct sports teams in Louisville, Kentucky
Negro league baseball teams
Baseball teams established in 1887
Baseball teams disestablished in 1887
1887 establishments in Kentucky
1887 disestablishments in Kentucky